Mountain of Mystery is a  Navajo Sandstone summit located in Zion National Park, in Washington County of southwest Utah, United States. This peak rises above Orderville Canyon on its north side, and Mystery Canyon on the south. Its neighbors include Mount Majestic, Cathedral Mountain, Observation Point, Cable Mountain,  Angels Landing, and The Organ. This feature's name was officially adopted in 1934 by the U.S. Board on Geographic Names. The first ascent via the Northeast Buttress was made 15 September 2001, by Brian Cabe and Tom Jones.

Climate
Spring and fall are the most favorable seasons to visit Mountain of Mystery. According to the Köppen climate classification system, it is located in a Cold semi-arid climate zone, which is defined by the coldest month having an average mean temperature below , and at least 50% of the total annual precipitation being received during the spring and summer.

Gallery

See also

 List of mountains in Utah
 Geology of the Zion and Kolob canyons area
 Colorado Plateau

References

External links

 Zion National Park National Park Service
 Weather forecast: Mountain of Mystery
 Mountain of Mystery painting by Thomas Moran

Mountains of Utah
Zion National Park
Mountains of Washington County, Utah
Sandstone formations of the United States
Colorado Plateau
North American 2000 m summits